Bambú, Bambú is a song written by Patrick Teixeira and Donga and recorded by Carmen Miranda in 1939 for the film Down Argentine Way.

References

External links
Gravações americanas de Carmen Miranda

Samba songs
1939 songs
Carmen Miranda songs
Portuguese-language songs
Brazilian songs